Matt Parkinson can refer to:

 Matt Parkinson (comedian), Australian comedian
 Matt Parkinson (cricketer) (born 1996), English cricketer
 Matthew Parkinson (born 1972), English cricketer